Charles Oscar Andrews (March 7, 1877September 18, 1946) was a Democratic Party politician from Florida, who represented Florida in the United States Senate from 1936 until 1946.

Early life 
Charles O. Andrews was born in Ponce de Leon, Florida in 1877. He attended public school and the South Florida Military Institute at Bartow, Florida. In 1901 he graduated from the Florida State Normal School at Gainesville, Florida and the University of Florida at Gainesville in 1907.

Military service and early career 
During the Spanish–American War he served as a captain in the Florida National Guard from 1903–1905. Andrews became secretary of the Florida State Senate, holding that position from 1905–1907. About the same time he began studying law. He was admitted to the bar in 1907 and commenced practicing law in DeFuniak Springs, Florida. He returned to the Florida State Senate as secretary from 1909-1911. He was appointed judge of the criminal court of record of Walton County, Florida 1910–1911, assistant attorney general of Florida 1912–1919, then circuit judge of the seventeenth judicial circuit 1919–1925. Subsequent state positions were as general counsel of the Florida Real Estate Commission 1925–1928, member of the Florida House of Representatives in 1927, attorney for Orlando, Florida 1926–1929, and State supreme court commissioner 1929–1932.

U.S. Senator 

On November 3, 1936, voters elected Andrews to Congress as a Democrat to the United States Senate to fill the vacancy caused by the death of Park Trammell. In early October 1940, a story spread that he would rather be a federal judge than a US Senator. After this it was speculated that US President Franklin Delano Roosevelt would appoint Andrews to a federal judge seat in Tampa. This speculation later ended in late October when US Senator Claude Pepper from Florida met with President Roosevelt to discuss possible candidates to succeed Judge Ackerman's and Pepper was informed by officials that he exceeded the administrations age limit of 60 as he was 62. Andrews was re-elected in 1940 without opposition in the general election.  Andrews continued to serve until his death in Washington, D.C. on September 18, 1946. 

Notably in 1943 he would attempt to repeal the Chinese Exclusion Act. On September 30, 1943 Andrews proposed S.1404 in the Senate which would have repealed the Chinese Exclusion Act and was identical to the bill which was proposed by Warren Magnuson of Washington in the House of Representatives. Ultimately, the bill proposed by Andrews did not go through as the Senate Committee on Immigration decided that it would be quicker to go through the House bill. The House bill would end up passing the House and later the Senate before being signed into law on December 17 by President Roosevelt.

During his time in the United States Senate he was chairman of the Committee on Enrolled Bills (Seventy-ninth United States Congress), served with the Committee on Public Buildings and Grounds (79th Congress), on the Special Committee on Reconstruction of the Senate Roof and Skylights (79th Congress). He is interred in Greenwood Cemetery.

See also
 List of United States Congress members who died in office (1900–49).

References

External links
 
 

1877 births
1946 deaths
People from Holmes County, Florida
Presbyterians from Florida
Democratic Party United States senators from Florida
Democratic Party members of the Florida House of Representatives
Florida state court judges
People from DeFuniak Springs, Florida
Fredric G. Levin College of Law alumni
American military personnel of the Spanish–American War